Rolf (Rudolf) Lukowsky (14 July 1926 – 25 July 2021) was a German composer and choral director.

Youth and education 
Lukowsky's father Josef was organist and choirmaster at the Catholic . At the instigation of his father, he did not become a member of the Hitler Youth or the Deutsches Jungvolk, but of the Catholic youth organisations  and Bund Neudeutschland. After primary school he attended the Canisius-Kolleg Berlin until its closure in 1940. After completing his Reichsarbeitsdienst, he volunteered as a reserve officer. Due to disciplinary misconduct, he was not promoted to sergeant, which, according to his own assessment, saved him from deployment to the Eastern Front in World War II.

After the end of the war, the family found accommodation in Saxony-Anhalt. Lukowsky joined the Free German Youth and trained as a Neulehrer. In 1948, he founded the Ernst Thälmann Pioneer Organisation. From 1950 to 1956, he directed the Buna choir in Halle.

In 1954, he began a two-year study of music education for the upper school at the Martin Luther University of Halle-Wittenberg. His teachers included Max Schneider, Walther Siegmund-Schultze, Siegfried Bimberg and Fritz Reuter. With Siegfried Bimberg (1927-2008) and Friedrich Krell (1928-2020), the Institute for Music Education there produced two more graduates who later had a formative influence on choral music in the GDR.

Further career 
In 1956, he became a member of the SED. 50 years later, he describes his political attitude as follows:

In the same year, he followed his composition professor Fritz Reuter to the Humboldt University Berlin and began an Aspirantur, which ended in 1959 with the promotion to Doktor. At the same time, he taught students music theory, folk song and choral conducting. During this time, he also founded the chamber choir of the Institute for Music Education. He completed another aspirancy in 1961 with the habilitation and was subsequently appointed lecturer in music theory and university music director. In concerts with the choirs of the university and the Collegium musicum instrumentale, which he also founded, he performed his own compositions and works by other contemporary artists as well as classical works; in addition, he made recordings for disks, radio and television.

In 1964, he ended his teaching career and turned to other priorities. He became chairman of the Berlin Composers' Association. In this context, he met the singer and actor Ernst Busch in 1965, whereupon a close musical collaboration developed that lasted until his death. Lukowsky arranged and composed for Busch, rehearsed with him and accompanied him as pianist and conductor at performances and recordings.

In addition to these diverse commitments, he still found time for productive composition. His first song Fleißig, nur fleißig, ihr Mädel und Jungen had already appeared around 1949. During his work at the HU, he wrote several cantatas and choral cycles, which he performed and recorded with his ensembles. These compositions were mostly intended for official occasions and accordingly had a pro-socialist, State-supporting content. Even after the end of the GDR, his numerous arrangements of folk songs in various degrees of difficulty, which were widely disseminated through recordings, among other things, have remained popular. After 1990, he also wrote settings of sacred texts.

In an interview he describes his activities during these years as follows:

Trivia 
Lukowsky's father Josef (1896-1973), a pupil of Carl Thiel, was also a choral conductor and composer and for a time held a lectureship at Humboldt University, as did his son later. Lukowsky was married and lived in Bernau near Berlin. By his own account, he bought and owned "all the songbooks there are".

Work

Lieder 
 Winterlied (Auf die Straßen fällt ein Schnee)

Liedbearbeitungen 
 Abend wird es wieder
 Als wir jüngst in Regensburg waren
 Das anmutige, schöne Weiß
 Das Heidenröslein
 Das Lieben bringt groß Freud
 Der Mond ist aufgegangen
 Der Schneider Jahrtag
 Es kommt ein Schiff geladen
 
 Herbei, o ihr Gläubigen
 Horch, was kommt von draußen rein
 Im schönsten Wiesengrunde
 Leise zieht durch mein Gemüt
 Nicht die Zeiten sind schlecht
 Schönster Abendstern
 Weiß mir ein Blümlein blaue
 
 Wie schön blüht uns der Maien

Secular works 
 Breitet leuchtend euch im Blauen
 Eisler-Zitate nach Sinnsprüchen und einer Zwölftonreihe des Komponisten Hanns Eisler
 Lied vom Klassenfeind
 Sine musica nulla vita
 Wir freun uns auf den Wind von morgen (cantata)

Sacred works 
 Ave Maria
 Missa vocale Romanum
 Pater noster
 Salve, Regina

Audio samples 
 Als wir jüngst zu Regensburg waren (Bearbeitung)
 Geht der Tag mit leisem Schritt (Chorleiter)

References

External links 
 
 

1926 births
2021 deaths
20th-century classical composers
German musicologists
German music educators
Academic staff of the Humboldt University of Berlin
20th-century German composers
Reich Labour Service members
German Army soldiers of World War II